Mediator of RNA polymerase II transcription subunit 23 is an enzyme that in humans is encoded by the MED23 gene.

Function 

The activation of gene transcription is a multistep process that is triggered by factors that recognize transcriptional enhancer sites in DNA. These factors work with co-activators to direct transcriptional initiation by the RNA polymerase II apparatus. The protein encoded by this gene is a subunit of the CRSP (cofactor required for SP1 activation) complex, which, along with TFIID, is required for efficient activation by SP1. This protein is also a component of other multisubunit complexes e.g. thyroid hormone receptor-(TR-) associated proteins which interact with TR and facilitate TR function on DNA templates in conjunction with initiation factors and cofactors. This protein also acts as a metastasis suppressor. Two alternatively spliced transcript variants encoding different isoforms have been described for this gene.

Interactions 

CRSP3 has been shown to interact with Estrogen receptor alpha, CEBPB and Cyclin-dependent kinase 8.

References

External links

Further reading